Rosine Deréan (23 February 1910 – 14 March 2001) was a French actress. She was born in Paris and died in Genille, Indre-et-Loire, France.

Selected filmography
Moon Over Morocco (1931)
 The Yellow Dog (1932)
 The Beautiful Sailor (1932)
 To the Polls, Citizens (1932)
 The Two Orphans (1933)
 Gold (1934; French-language version)
 Lake of Ladies (1934)
 Merchant of Love (1935)
 Veille d'armes (1935)
 La Route heureuse (1936)
 Confessions of a Cheat (1936)
 Let's Make a Dream (1936)
 Gigolette (1937)
 Arsene Lupin, Detective (1937)
 The Pearls of the Crown (1937)
 Radio Surprises (1940)
 The Murderer is Not Guilty (1946)

External links

1910 births
2001 deaths
French film actresses
Actresses from Paris
20th-century French actresses